Tom O'Flaherty (born 21 July 1994) is an English rugby union player who plays for Premiership Rugby Sale Sharks. His playing position is a Wing.

O’Flaherty started playing rugby at Old Alleynians in a highly successful minis side, before going on to play for Dulwich College winning the Daily Mail Trophy twice and then briefly Blackheath before moving to study at Cardiff University where he played for Cardiff RFC towards the end of 2013 and scored four tries in four appearances. A move to Bridgend Ravens followed where he scored 18 tries in 25 appearances in the 2014–15 season.
That campaign culminated in the Ravens lifting the SWALEC Cup with O’Flaherty scoring the match-winning try against Pontypridd RFC in the final at the Principality Stadium, Cardiff.
He spent a season in France, with French Top 14 side Montpellier but returned to Wales after a season where he had joint registration with Bridgend and the Ospreys. After debuting for the Ospreys in 2016 against Harlequins F.C. in the Anglo-Welsh Cup he played against Cardiff Blues and Glasgow and also came off the bench versus Bristol Rugby. He was also part of the Ospreys squad for that season's Singha Premiership 7s competition.

On 26 January 2017, O'Flaherty signed for English club Exeter Chiefs in the Aviva Premiership prior to the 2017–18 season.

O'Flaherty played on 30 March 2018 as Exeter beat Bath Rugby in the final of the Anglo-Welsh Cup.

On 29 March 2022, it was announced that O'Flaherty would leave Exeter to join Premiership rivals Sale Sharks on a long-term deal ahead of the 2022-23 season.

Honours
SWALEC Cup
Winner 2014-15

Anglo-Welsh Cup
Winner 2017-18

Heineken Champions Cup
Winner 2019-20

References

External links 
Ospreys Player Profile
Cardiff RFC Player Profile

1994 births
Living people
English rugby union players
Exeter Chiefs players
Ospreys (rugby union) players
Rugby union players from Lambeth
Rugby union wings
Sale Sharks players